Iivo Henrik Niskanen (born 12 January 1992) is a Finnish cross-country skier who has competed in the FIS Cross-Country World Cup since 2011. He is a three-time Olympic champion.

Career
Iivo Niskanen made his individual World Cup debut on 12 March 2011, when he became 69th in a 20 km skiathlon in Lahti, Finland. He had his breakthrough at the international level when he won the 15-kilometre classic race at the 2014 under-23 World Championships in Val di Fiemme on 30 January 2014. He won the race with a 17.4 seconds margin to Sergey Ustiugov. Only three days after he won the gold medal at the under-23 World Championships, he became 8th in a 15 km classic World Cup race in Toblach, Italy.
 
He won the gold medal in men's team sprint at the 2014 Winter Olympics with Sami Jauhojärvi. Following the pair's achievement, Niskanen and Jauhojärvi shared the Finnish Sports Personality of the Year award in 2014. Niskanen finished 4th on the prestigious 50 km race in Holmenkollen on 8 March 2014.

In the following 2014–15 season, Niskanen won his first World Cup victory on 30 November 2014 by winning a 15 km classic race on home soil in Ruka, Finland.

At the 2017 World Championships in Lahti, Niskanen won a bronze medal in the team sprint together with teammate Jauhojärvi. Niskanen led the race into its final stages, but a crash with Norway's Emil Iversen saw Russia and Italy surpass them. On 1 March, he became World champion on the 15 km classic event, winning the gold medal 17.9 seconds ahead of Martin Johnsrud Sundby. He won his second Finnish Sports Personality of the Year in 2017.

In the 2018 Winter Olympics in Pyeongchang, Niskanen became individual Olympic champion on the men's 50 kilometre classical. In January 2019, Niskanen was awarded his third Finnish Sports Personality of the Year for the year 2018, the first since Marjo Matikainen in 1987 to win the award two consecutive years; the first male since Kaarlo Kangasniemi in 1969.

At the 2019 World Championships in Seefeld in Tirol, Austria, Niskanen won a bronze medal in the 15 km classic event. This turned out to be his only medal at the championships as he finished fourth in both the skiathlon and the relay.

Iivo Niskanen started the 2019–20 season with his third 15 km classic World Cup win in Ruka and a third place in the overall 2019 Nordic Opening. He reached the podium four more times during the season, including his first 15 km freestyle podium.

The 2020/21 season was something of a disappointment for Niskanen, who was left without any podium placements. In the WCH in Oberstdorf, he was in his season's best form, skiing a very strong 2nd leg in the relay and placing 6th in the 50 km classic, which he had won in the Winter Olympics three years earlier. However, missing out on a medal and a waxing failure in the 50-kilometre race enraged the ambitious skier.

In the 2021/22 season, Niskanen returned in stronger form and became the first Finnish male skier to reach the podium at the overall Tour de Ski, when he placed third. During the World Cup season, he took three wins and second place, all in 15 km classical. By placing fourth in the 50 km race in Holmenkollen in the absence of his closest rivals Alexander Bolshunov and Johannes Høsflot Klæbo, he secured himself the Distance discipline globe already before the World Cup finals in Falun. Niskanen is the first Finnish male skier to win the Distance World Cup.

The 2022 Winter Olympics in Beijing were a triumph for Niskanen, who won his third Olympic gold with a dominant performance in the 15 km classical and claimed a somewhat unexpected bronze medal in the 30 km skiathlon. Alongside these individual medals, Niskanen won silver in the classical team sprint with Joni Mäki, thus winning three medals total in Beijing. Niskanen has medaled in all three Olympics he has participated in. He is the fourth Finn to win three Olympic gold medals in cross-country skiing, the first to do so since Marja-Liisa Kirvesniemi's triple gold in Sarajevo 1984. He is also one of four Finnish athletes who have won gold in three different Olympics, summer or winter, after Paavo Nurmi, Veikko Hakulinen and Pertti Karppinen.

Cross-country skiing results
All results are sourced from the International Ski Federation (FIS).

Olympic Games
 5 medals – (3 gold, 1 silver, 1 bronze)

Distance reduced to 30 km due to weather conditions.

World Championships
 4 medals – (1 gold, 1 silver, 2 bronze)

World Cup

Season titles
 1 title – (1 distance)

Season standings

Individual podiums
 8 victories – (6 , 2 )
 20 podiums – (14 , 6 )

Team podiums
3 podiums  – (2 , 1 )

Awards
Finnish Sports Personality of the Year: 2014 (shared with Sami Jauhojärvi), 2017, 2018, 2022

Personal life
Iivo Niskanen's sister Kerttu is also a cross-country skier and a four-time Olympic medalist. Iivo and Kerttu Niskanen are regarded as great sporting heroes in their childhood hometown of Vieremä, North Savo, which regularly hosts festivities following the siblings' Olympic and World Championship success. They are also the only siblings who have won cross-country World Cup races on the same day and place: this happened on 29 December 2021, when they won the 10 and 15 km classical Stage World Cup events in Lenzerheide, Switzerland. At the season finale in Falun, Sweden, the siblings shared a World Cup podium for the first time when they skied the 1st and 3rd legs of the mixed relay event, where Finland placed second. Niskanen's other sister Katri is a highly regarded Finnish fashion designer.

Iivo Niskanen married his long-time partner Saana Kemppainen in the summer of 2018. The couple resides in Kuopio, Finland, and Niskanen currently represents the local club Puijon Hiihtoseura.

See also
List of Olympic medalist families

References

External links

1992 births
Living people
Sportspeople from Oulu
Finnish male cross-country skiers
Olympic cross-country skiers of Finland
Cross-country skiers at the 2014 Winter Olympics
Cross-country skiers at the 2018 Winter Olympics
Cross-country skiers at the 2022 Winter Olympics
Medalists at the 2014 Winter Olympics
Medalists at the 2018 Winter Olympics
Medalists at the 2022 Winter Olympics
Olympic gold medalists for Finland
Olympic silver medalists for Finland
Olympic bronze medalists for Finland
Olympic medalists in cross-country skiing
Tour de Ski skiers
FIS Nordic World Ski Championships medalists in cross-country skiing
21st-century Finnish people